Omorgus gemmatus is a species of hide beetle in the subfamily Omorginae and subgenus Afromorgus.

References

gemmatus
Beetles described in 1789